This is a list of Arab League countries by gross domestic product at purchasing power parity (PPP). Gross domestic product is the value of all final goods and services produced within a nation in a given year.

The table below shows the latest PPP and PPP per capita data for the 22/23` members of the Arab League. Most figures are from the International Monetary Fund based on 2019 estimates, and are shown in international dollars (Int$). Figures from other sources and years are referenced and noted as such. Figures for Syria are estimates for 2015, and figures for Palestine are estimates for 2014. The GDP per capita figure for Somalia is unavailable.[]

See also
Economy of the Arab League

Notes

References

Arab League
Arab League